Marco Angeletti (born 19 February 1986 in Rome, Italy) is an Italian footballer. He plays as a defender.

External links
 
 

1986 births
Italian footballers
S.S. Lazio players
A.S. Sambenedettese players
S.S. Virtus Lanciano 1924 players
Atletico Roma F.C. players
A.S.D. Barletta 1922 players
S.P. La Fiorita players
Living people
Footballers from Rome
Association football defenders